"Helvettiin jäätynyt" is the second single from the Ruoska album Rabies.  In Finnish, "Helvettiin jäätynyt" means frozen in hell.  This single features two songs ("Irti" and "Kosketa", both of which are on the Radium album) that were remixed by the lead singer of Turmion Kätilöt, MC Raaka Pee.

Track listings
 "Helvettiin jäätynyt"
 "Irti (MC Raaka Pee remix)"
 "Kosketa (Päätä seinään MC Raaka Pee remix)"

References

External links
 Additional information (in Finnish)
 "Helvettiin jäätynyt" lyrics

Ruoska songs
2008 singles
2008 songs
EMI Records singles
Song articles with missing songwriters